Tekele Cotton (born May 27, 1993) is an American professional basketball player for CSO Voluntari of the Liga Națională.

Professional career
On September 2, 2015, Cotton signed with the German club Riesen Ludwigsburg.

On July 17, 2018, Cotton signed a deal with the Italian club Fiat Torino for the 2018–19 LBA season.

In 2020, Cotton spent three games with Kalev/Cramo of the Latvian–Estonian League before the season was terminated. On August 8, 2020, he signed with Benedetto XIV Cento of the Serie A2. Cotton averaged 14 points and 3 assists per game.

On February 7, 2022, he has signed with MHP Riesen Ludwigsburg of the Basketball Bundesliga (BBL).

On August 5, 2022, he has signed with CSO Voluntari of the Liga Națională.

References

External links
Tekele Cotton LBA profile
Tekele Cotton Sports Reference profile
Tekele Cotton BBL profile
Wichita State Shockers bio

1993 births
Living people
American expatriate basketball people in Estonia
American expatriate basketball people in Germany
American expatriate basketball people in Italy
American men's basketball players
Auxilium Pallacanestro Torino players
Basketball players from Marietta, Georgia
BC Kalev/Cramo players
CSO Voluntari players
Lega Basket Serie A players
Riesen Ludwigsburg players
Point guards
Shooting guards
Wichita State Shockers men's basketball players